The Swingate transmitting station is a facility for FM-transmission in the village of Swingate, near Dover, Kent. This station was one of the first 5 Chain Home Radar stations completed in 1936 and was originally designated AMES (Air Ministry Experimental Station) 04 Dover. The FM transmitting antennas are attached to what was the middle tower; microwave link dishes and mobile telephone antennas were spread across all three towers. The south tower was dismantled in March 2010, as a result, only two remain.

The Swingate towers no longer have the three cantilever platforms that were fitted originally.

History
Originally there were four towers with wires stretched between them to transmit radio waves that were detected by a group of four smaller towers to the east of the surviving ones. The receiver towers were demolished after the war, along with one of the transmitter towers. Subsequently the north mast was demolished and replaced with a similar tower with a different bracing design. During the Cold War the towers sprouted four transmitters at their base which were popularly assumed to be part of the US ACE High communication system but were more likely an RAF link to Germany. The south tower was dismantled in March 2010.

Timeline
In 1936, four transmitters with platforms were erected. In 1955 one transmitter was dismantled, leaving three standing. In 1991 the north tower was replaced by a shorter one. In 2010 the south tower was dismantled.

Channels available from this site

High Frequency Trading 
Several of the microwave dishes located on one of the towers provide connections via a chain of towers between the NYSE Euronext datacentres in Basildon and Slough, and Frankfurt for use in High Frequency Trading

Analogue radio 
The transmitter is the main transmission station for the BBC which serves the bulk of Kent.

See also
 Dover transmitting station - broadcasts TV, DAB and commercial FM radio from a site west of the town

References

External links

Swingate transmitting station at mb21
National Geographic photo showing the original configuration of four transmitters and four receiver towers

Transmitter sites in England